The Tanala tufted-tailed rat (Eliurus tanala) is a species of rodent in the family Nesomyidae. It is found only in Madagascar.

References
Notes

Sources
Musser, G. G. and M. D. Carleton. 2005. Superfamily Muroidea. pp. 894–1531 in Mammal Species of the World a Taxonomic and Geographic Reference. D. E. Wilson and D. M. Reeder eds. Johns Hopkins University Press, Baltimore.

Eliurus
Mammals of Madagascar
Mammals described in 1896
Taxonomy articles created by Polbot